Christof Koch (born November 13, 1956) is a German-American neurophysiologist and computational neuroscientist best known for his work on the neural basis of consciousness. He is the president and chief scientist of the Allen Institute for Brain Science in Seattle. From 1986 until 2013, he was a professor at the California Institute of Technology.

Early life and education
Koch was born in the Midwestern United States, and subsequently was raised in the Netherlands, Germany, Canada, and Morocco. Koch is the son of German parents; his father was a diplomat, as is his older brother Michael. He was raised as a Roman Catholic and attended a Jesuit high school in Morocco. His interest in consciousness commenced as a child when he decided that consciousness must apply to all animals not just humans.

He received a PhD in sciences for his works in the field of nonlinear information processing from the Max Planck Institute in Tübingen, Germany, in 1982.

Koch worked for four years at the Artificial Intelligence Laboratory at MIT before joining, in 1986, the newly started Computation and Neural Systems PhD program at the California Institute of Technology.

Career
Koch has authored more than 300 scientific papers and five books about how computers and neurons process information.

In 1986, Koch and Shimon Ullman proposed the idea of a visual saliency map in the primate visual system. Subsequently, his then PhD-student, Laurent Itti, and Koch developed a popular suite of visual saliency algorithms.

For over two decades, Koch and his students have carried out detailed biophysical simulations of the electrical properties of neuronal tissue, from simulating the details of the action potential propagation along axons and dendrites to the synthesis of the local field potential and the EEG from the electrical activity of large populations of excitable neurons.

Since the early 1990s, Koch has argued that identifying the mechanistic basis of consciousness is a scientifically tractable problem, and has been  influential in arguing that consciousness can be approached using the modern tools of neurobiology. He and his student Nao Tsuchiya invented continuous flash suppression, an efficient psychophysical masking technique for rendering images invisible for many seconds. They have used this technique to argue that selective attention and consciousness are distinct phenomena, with distinct biological functions and mechanisms.

Koch's primary collaborator in the endeavor of locating the neural correlates of consciousness was the molecular biologist turned neuroscientist, Francis Crick, starting with their first paper in 1990 and their last one, that Crick edited on the day of his death, July 24, 2004, on the relationship between the claustrum, a mysterious anatomical structure situated underneath the insular cortex, and consciousness.

Over the last decade, Koch has worked closely with the psychiatrist and neuroscientist Giulio Tononi. Koch advocates for a modern variant of panpsychism, the ancient philosophical belief that some form of consciousness can be found in all things. Tononi's Integrated Information Theory (IIT) of consciousness differs from classical
panpsychism in that it only ascribes consciousness to things with some degree of irreducible cause-effect power, which could include the internet "Thus, its sheer number of components exceeds that of any one human brain. Whether or not the Internet today feels like something to itself is completely speculative. Still, it is certainly conceivable." but does not include "a bunch of disconnected neurons in a dish, a heap of sand, a galaxy of stars or a black hole," and by providing an analytical and empirically accessible framework for understanding experience and its mechanistic
origins. He and Tononi claim that IIT is able to solve the problem in conceiving how one mind can be composed of an aggregate of "smaller" minds, known as the combination problem.

Koch writes a popular column, Consciousness Redux, for Scientific American Mind on scientific and popular topics pertaining to consciousness.

Koch co-founded the Methods in Computational Neuroscience summer course at the Marine Biological Laboratory in Woods Hole in 1988, the Neuromorphic Engineering summer school in Telluride, Colorado in 1994 and the Dynamic Brain summer course at the Friday Harbor Laboratories on San Juan Island in 2014.  All three summer schools continue to be taught.

In early 2011, Koch became the chief scientist and the President of the Allen Institute for Brain Science, leading their  ten-year project concerning high-throughput large-scale cortical coding. The mission is to understand the computations that lead from photons to behavior by observing and modeling the physical transformations of signals in the visual brain of behaving mice. The project seeks to  catalogue all the building blocks (ca. 100 distinct cell types) of the then visual cortical regions and associated structures (thalamus, colliculus) and their dynamics. The scientists seek to know what the animal sees, how it thinks, and how it decides. They seek to map out the murine mind in a quantitative manner. The Allen Institute for Brain Science currently 
employs about 300 scientists, engineers, technologists and supporting personnel.
The first eight years of this ten-year endeavor to build brain observatories were funded by a donation more than $500 million by Microsoft founder and philanthropist Paul G. Allen.

Koch is a proponent of the idea of consciousness emerging out of complex nervous networks. In 2014, he published a short discussion work, In which I argue that consciousness is a fundamental property of complex things, where he introduced the concept that consciousness is a fundamental property of networked entities, and therefore cannot be derived from anything else, since it is a simple substance.

Personal life
Koch is a vegetarian, a bicyclist, and an experienced rock climber.

Books
Methods in Neuronal Modeling: From Ions to Networks, The MIT Press, (1998), 
Biophysics of Computation: Information Processing in Single Neurons, Oxford Press, (1999), 
The Quest for Consciousness: a Neurobiological Approach, Roberts and Co., (2004), 
Consciousness: Confessions of a Romantic Reductionist, The MIT Press, (2012), 
 The Feeling of Life Itself - Why Consciousness is Widespread but Can't be Computed, The MIT Press, (2019),

Selected publications

References

External links

 
 
 

1956 births
Living people
American cognitive neuroscientists
American consciousness researchers and theorists
California Institute of Technology faculty
American people of German descent
Panpsychism
People from Kansas City, Missouri
Max Planck Society alumni
University of Tübingen alumni
20th-century American physicists
21st-century American physicists
Scientific American people